Hadi Dehghani (born March 21, 1990) is an Iranian footballer. He currently plays for Aluminium in the Azadegan League.

Club career
Dehghani joined Malavan in 2010 on loan after spending the previous season at Aluminium in the Azadegan League.

 Assist Goals

References

Living people
Malavan players
Aluminium Hormozgan F.C. players
Iranian footballers
1990 births
Association football midfielders